Haustellum kurodai is a species of sea snail, a marine gastropod mollusk in the family Muricidae, the murex snails or rock snails.

Subspecies
 Haustellum kurodai kurodai (Shikama, 1964): synonym of Haustellum kurodai Shikama, 1964
 Haustellum kurodai langleitae Houart, 1993: synonym of Haustellum langleitae Houart, 1993
 Haustellum kurodai vicdani Kosuge, 1980: synonym of Haustellum vicdani Kosuge, 1980

Description

Distribution

References

 Shikama, T. 1964. Description of a new species of Murex and Conus from the Arafura Sea. Venus 23(1): 33–37, pl. 3 
 Houart R. (2014). Living Muricidae of the world. Muricinae. Murex, Promurex, Haustellum, Bolinus, Vokesimurex and Siratus. Harxheim: ConchBooks. 197 pp.

Haustellum
Gastropods described in 1964